Sherlock Holmes and Sir Arthur Conan Doyle's Sherlock Holmes (a.k.a. The Cases of Sherlock Holmes) are two British series of Sherlock Holmes adaptations for television produced by the BBC in 1965 and 1968 respectively. The 1965 production, which followed a pilot the year before, was the second BBC series of Sherlock Holmes adaptations, after one starring Alan Wheatley in 1951.

Plot
Set in the Victorian era, Sherlock Holmes is a brilliant consultant detective, as well as a private detective. He is consulted by the police and by other private detectives to aid them in solving crimes. He also takes private cases himself, and his clients range from paupers to kings. His deductive abilities and encyclopedic knowledge help him solve the most complex cases. He is assisted in his work by military veteran, Dr. John Watson, with whom he shares a flat at 221B Baker Street.

Cast
Douglas Wilmer - Sherlock Holmes (1964–1965)
Peter Cushing - Sherlock Holmes (1968)
Nigel Stock - Doctor Watson (1964–1968)

Recurring
 Mary Holder (1964)/Enid Lindsey (1965, 3 episodes) - Mrs. Hudson
Grace Arnold - Mrs. Hudson (1968, 4 episodes)
Peter Madden - Inspector Lestrade (1965, 6 episodes) (Madden would also portray Bill McCarthy in the 1968 series adaptation of "The Boscombe Valley Mystery" and Von Tirpitz in The Private Life of Sherlock Holmes in 1970)
William Lucas - Inspector Lestrade (1968, 2 episodes)
George A. Cooper - Inspector Gregson (1968, 2 episodes)

Guest stars
David Burke - Sir George Burnwell in "The Beryl Coronet" (portrayed Dr Watson in the first two series of Granada's 1980's series Sherlock Holmes)
Edward Hardwicke - Davenport in "The Greek Interpreter" (portrayed Dr Watson in the remaining series of the Granada series, after Burke left the role.)
Frank Middlemass - Peterson in "The Blue Carbuncle" (portrayed Henry Baker in the 1984 Granada adaptation of the same story, and Dr Froelich in Sherlock Holmes and the Leading Lady)

Production

Development
In 1964, the BBC secured rights to adapt any five Sherlock Holmes stories with an option for a further eight from the Doyle estate. A handful of Doyle's stories were excluded from the deal: The Hound of the Baskervilles because Hammer Films' rights would not expire until 1965 following their 1959 film adaptation, and "A Scandal in Bohemia", "The Final Problem" and "The Adventure of the Empty House" which had been secured by producers of the Broadway musical Baker Street.

In 1964, an adaptation of "The Adventure of the Speckled Band" was commissioned as a pilot for a twelve part series of Sherlock Holmes stories. Giles Cooper wrote the adaptation and Douglas Wilmer was cast as Holmes and Nigel Stock as Watson, with Felix Felton as Dr. Grimesby Roylott.

The hour-long pilot was aired as an episode of the BBC anthology series Detective on 18 May and was popular enough to re-air on 25 September this time under the banner of Encore which was a BBC2 repeat slot.

Wilmer and Stock were secured for a twelve part series (in black-and-white) to air the following year. Wilmer was a lifelong fan of Doyle's stories and looked forward to portraying the legendary sleuth.

Wilmer responded to criticism of his portrayal by pointing out that he played the character as written.

Once the series was underway, new opening and closing titles of The Speckled Band were recorded to better match the ongoing series so the pilot episode could be included in a package to be sold abroad. It has been reported that having viewed 25 September repeat of The Speckled Band, Wilmer came to the conclusion that his performance of Holmes was "too smooth, urbane, and civilised" and as filming progressed Wilmer altered his performance to reflect "a much more primitive person, more savage and ruthless." Wilmer himself disputed this in a 2009 interview.

At the time, due to strict agreements with the talent unions, BBC drama productions could generally only be repeated once within two years of the first transmission, and thus all twelve episodes were re-run over the late summer and early autumn of 1966, albeit in a different running order. The continued favourable reception led the BBC to proceed with the option of a second series.

Hiatus and changing lead
In the late summer and early autumn of 1966, the Wilmer series was granted a repeat run and the success of the run convinced the BBC to take up an option on a second run of episodes. BBC television drama chief Andrew Osborn reached out to Wilmer's agent about potential availability for a second series. Wilmer declined the invitation after discovering the plan to reduce the number of rehearsal days. Wilmer later stated that the series was "fraught with difficulty", riddled with incompetence and the scripts often came in late. He claimed that the scriptwriters ranged from "the brilliant to the absolutely deplorable". Some of the scripts were so lacking in quality that Wilmer himself rewrote them, sometimes staying up until two o'clock in the morning rewriting. Years later, Wilmer would briefly return to the role (albeit in a supporting role) in Gene Wilder's The Adventure of Sherlock Holmes' Smarter Brother, with Thorley Walters as Dr. Watson.

The BBC searched for a new actor to play Holmes. The first person Osborn suggested was John Neville. Neville had previously assayed the role in A Study in Terror (1965) and Nigel Stock felt the film was quite good. Neville had prior commitments to the Nottingham Playhouse and was unable to appear in a series at the time.

Next, Osborn looked at Eric Porter. While Porter ultimately did not get the role, he did portray Professor Moriarty opposite Jeremy Brett's Holmes in Granada Television's The Adventures of Sherlock Holmes.

While the hunt continued for a new Sherlock Holmes, William Sterling was appointed to produce the second series. Sterling created a wish list of "International Guest Stars" to appear on the programme including Raymond Massey (an early interpreter of Holmes in the 1931 version of The Speckled Band) as Jefferson Hope in A Study in Scarlet, George Sanders as Mycroft Holmes in The Greek Interpreter, Leo McKern (who later portrayed Professor Moriarty in The Adventure of Sherlock Holmes' Smarter Brother) as Black Gorgiano in The Red Circle (though an adaptation of The Red Circle never took place in the series) and Hayley Mills as Alice Turner in The Boscombe Valley Mystery. None of which came to pass as the budgets would not allow for it.

Finally, Peter Cushing was approached to take over the role of Sherlock Holmes for the 1968 series. Having already played Holmes in the Hammer films adaptation of The Hound of the Baskervilles (1959), Cushing was eager to play the role again. Like Wilmer, Cushing was an avid fan of Doyle and looked forward to portraying the detective correctly.

Unlike the Wilmer episodes, this series was produced in colour. Economic cut-backs required the production to abandon plans for celebrity villains such as Peter Ustinov, George Sanders, and Orson Welles.

The initial plan was for 90% of the programme to be shot on film on location. Production began with a two-part version of The Hound of the Baskervilles giving Cushing another go round at the tale. This version was the first actually filmed on Dartmoor and the cost ran £13,000 over budget causing the BBC to scale back their intentions and the bulk of the remainder of the series was shot on studio sets.

As filming continued Cushing found himself facing production difficulties the likes of which had prompted Wilmer to forgo another round. Wilmer summarised a later conversation with Cushing:

Filming time was cut back. Cushing stated that the hectic schedule affected his performance.

Twelve of the Cushing episodes except the episodes The Second Stain, The Greek Interpreter, Black Peter, and The Blue Carbuncle were repeated between July and September 1970, again in a different running order.

Episodes

Detective (1964)

Sherlock Holmes (1965)

Sir Arthur Conan Doyle's Sherlock Holmes (1968)

Planned continuation
The Cushing series was a success and the BBC's Andrew Osborn was interested in making a third series. Had this third series commenced, the plan was to dramatise stories from The Exploits of Sherlock Holmes, a short story collection written by Adrian Conan Doyle and John Dickson Carr, but was not eventually made.

Unused scripts

1965:
 "Charles Augustus Milverton" (different adaptation)
 "The Red-Headed League" (different adaptation)
 "The Blue Carbuncle" (different adaptation to 1968 version)
 "The Three Garridebs"
 "The Priory School"
 "The Boscombe Valley Mystery" (different adaptation to 1968 version)
 "The Golden Pince-Nez"
 "The Sussex Vampire"

1968:
 "The Hound of the Baskervilles" (two episodes, different adaptation)
 "The Musgrave Ritual" (different adaptation)
 "Wisteria Lodge" (different adaptation)
 "The Red Circle"

Missing episodes 
Many portions of this series are no longer held by the BBC. Between 1967 and 1978 the BBC routinely deleted archive programmes, for various practical reasons (lack of space, scarcity of materials, a lack of rebroadcast rights).

Sherlock Holmes is not unique in its losses, as many broadcasters regularly cleared their archives in this manner. Until the BBC changed its archiving policy in 1978, thousands of hours of programming, in all genres, were deleted. Other affected BBC series include the most famous present-day running series Doctor Who. Other non-running series that are lost include Dad's Army, Z-Cars, The Wednesday Play, Till Death Us Do Part and Not Only... But Also. ITV regional franchisees, such as Rediffusion Television and Associated Television, also deleted many programmes, including early videotaped episodes of The Avengers. Since the latter half of the 1970s, British television networks, television fans and enthusiasts, and official institutions such as the British Film Institute have developed an effort to recover and restore missing episodes of many 1950s and 1960s television programmes.

The Wilmer series survives largely intact to this day, with only two episodes incomplete. "The Abbey Grange" is missing its first half, while "The Bruce-Partington Plans" is missing its second half. The 2015 DVD release of the first series reconstructed the incomplete episodes as best as possible. For "The Abbey Grange", Douglas Wilmer was engaged to read the original story. For "The Bruce-Partington Plans", a sound recording was included of the second half of the episode, recorded off the television during the programme's original transmission. This was matched with publicity photographs for the episode and images of the script to reveal the end of the story and enable a complete viewing experience.

The 1968 series with Cushing was less fortunate, with many episodes now believed lost, despite the fact that it was made in colour and was shown abroad as late as 1975 (Spain). Only a handful of the episodes have survived, namely "A Study in Scarlet", "The Hound of the Baskervilles" (two parts), "The Boscombe Valley Mystery", "The Sign of Four" and "The Blue Carbuncle". All surviving episodes are available on DVD, with a Blu-ray release pending. In 2019 brief extracts from the episodes "The Second Stain", "The Dancing Men", "The Naval Treaty" and "Black Peter" were found in Belgium by Dutch historian Reinier Wels, and independently, an audio recording of "The Solitary Cyclist" was found by David Stuart Davies. The clips were included as a bonus feature on a DVD release of a TV interview with Peter Cushing, available in combination with a book.

Faithfulness towards the original stories 

This series is rewarded as being the first attempt at producing a faithful rendition of Sherlock Holmes. "The Hound of the Baskervilles" is seen as being more accurate in the depiction of the plot in general. Despite that, following changes were made for dramatization so that the narrative remains constant:

 "The Speckled Band" - The flashback was shown first (that includes Julia's death and Helen's romance) followed by Helen's consulting Holmes.
 "The Abbey Grange" - The Randall gang was shown and a certain Sergeant Mitchell was introduced for the episode.
 "The Man with the Twisted Lip" - Neville St Clair's attributed ability was developed at repartee by showing him quoting from the classics, including Shakespeare.
 "Charles Augustus Milverton" - The débutante Lady Eva Blackwell, a behind-the-scene important character was shown and the killer's identity was changed. It was for the first time the kiss of Holmes and Agatha was shown, albeit comically.
 "The Bruce-Partington Plans" - The capture of Hugo Oberstein was shown for the first time in any adaptation.
 "The Retired Colourman" - Inspector Mackinnon was replaced by Inspector Lestrade.
 "A Study in Scarlet" - Although it's not readily apparent in this adaptation, in the original story, the Mormon religion plays a strong role in the character's motivations and Brigham Young plays a part in the flashback denouement. At the time Conan Doyle was heavily criticized by Mormons, who felt the story presented their religion in a bad light. The basic plot of this episode resembles that of the original novel, regarding the murders and Holmes's investigation. However, there is absolutely no reference to Holmes and Watson having met for the first time. The opening of the novel covers the introduction of the two characters after Watson has been demobbed from the army. A certain Joey Daly who was not present in the original novel guest-starred this episode. Rest of the cast who have seriously influenced the story was shown in the end-credits.
 "The Hound of the Baskervilles" - Jack Stapleton died minutes after the Hound died while trying to escape in front of Sir Henry, Holmes and Watson. Watson tried to save him but Holmes stopped him from doing so.
"The Boscombe Valley Mystery" - Inspector Lestrade was replaced by Inspector Lanner and John Turner died immediately after confessing the truth
"The Blue Carbuncle" - Henry Baker was renamed Harold Baker to create a comical effect on Holmes' deduction.

The changes made in lost episodes are unknown.

German remake 
The West-German WDR channel produced Sherlock Holmes (1967-1968), a six-episode series based on the scripts from Detective and Sherlock Holmes. Erich Schellow starred as Holmes, and Paul Edwin Roth as Watson.

Reception
The initial 1965 series attracted over 11 million viewers per episode. The 1968 series was more successful, with upwards of 15.5 million viewers and one episode topping the top 20 programmes chart.

Reviewing the series for DVD Talk, Stuart Galbraith IV wrote, "To my surprise I generally preferred the Wilmer episodes to those starring Peter Cushing, even though I consider myself more a fan of Cushing while I merely admire Wilmer as an excellent actor. ... This series may seem downright prehistoric to some, but I found it to be surprisingly atmospheric, intelligent, and engaging, and Wilmer and Stock make a fine Holmes and Watson, in the top 25% certainly."

Galbraith further said of the Cushing episodes, "The 1968 Sherlock Holmes television series isn't really up to the level of the best film and TV adaptations, but it's still fun to see cult character actor Peter Cushing sink his teeth into the role again, and the adaptations themselves are respectable, just not distinctive."

Home media

In 1996 BBC Video released a single VHS cassette in the UK, containing The Speckled Band and The Illustrious Client.

In 2002, BBC Learning released The Hound of the Baskervilles on DVD, for sale by direct mail order in the UK only. The episodes was re-released by BBC Video for retail Region 2 sale in 2004, along with two further discs containing A Study in Scarlet and The Boscombe Valley Mystery, and The Sign of Four and The Blue Carbuncle respectively. The Region 1 release of these issues as a single box-set followed on 15 December 2009. These six episodes are the only ones to survive from the Cushing series.

Following the success of the Cushing release, the Region 1 Wilmer collection was released on 14 September 2010. This set contains all the surviving complete episodes from the 1965 series, but not the two incomplete episodes.

The BFI released a Region 2 collection of the Wilmer episodes on 30 March 2015. The set includes all surviving episodes and reconstructions of the incomplete episodes, as well as five audio commentaries, an interview with Wilmer, an illustrated booklet, and other special features.

References

External links

 (1964-1965)
 (1968)

1965 British television series debuts
1968 British television series endings
Television series set in the 19th century
Sherlock Holmes television series
1960s British drama television series
Lost BBC episodes
BBC mystery television shows
1960s British crime television series